Pratapgarh Junction railway station is a main railway station in Pratapgarh district, Uttar Pradesh. Its code is PBH. It serves Pratapgarh city. The station consists of five platforms.

The station is strategically situated on the Allahabad–Ayodhya Cantt and Varanasi–Lucknow railway route. The section is fully electrified.

Many important passenger amenity works have been sanctioned for upliftment of Pratapgarh railway station. Major items include improvement of circulating area, replacement of old FOB, provision of Lounge for passengers, extension, raising and improvement of platforms, platform resurfacing, renovation of waiting rooms, replacement of water hydrants on platform no. 3, provision of full length washing line, renovation of Pay and Use toilet, provision of 10 kWp solar panel & LED lights in station building, circulating area & on platforms etc., at approximate cost of Rs 8.75 crore.

The platforms are accessible via 2 foot overbridges. The platform and the foot overbridge are not suitable for people with disabilities and do not comply with the directions of the Government of India, Ministry of Social Justice and Empowerment. The lack of provision of lifts, escalator, underpass makes it difficult for people to go to other platforms.

Trains 

 Udyog Nagri Express- Pratapgarh to LTT Mumbai 
Pratapgarh–Kanpur Intercity Express
 Varanasi–Pratapgarh Passenger
 Pratapgarh–Lucknow DEMU
 Pratapgarh–Lucknow Passenger
 Padmavat Express- Pratapgarh to Delhi
Howrah - Amritsar (Punjab) Mail Express
 Bhopal–Pratapgarh Superfast Express
 Jaunpur–Raebareli Express
 Dehradun Janta Express- Banaras to Dehradun
 Archana Superfast Express- Jammu Tavi to Patna Jn
 Kashi Vishwanath Express-Banaras to New Delhi
 Banaras-Lucknow Intercity Express
 Nautanwa-Durg Express
 Manwar Sangam Express- Prayagraj Sangam to Basti
 Saryu Express- Prayagraj Sangam to Mankapur
 Agra-Kolkata Express
 Yashwantpur Superfast Express- Lucknow to Yashwantpur(Bangalore)
 Ekatmata Express- Lucknow to Pt. Deen Dayal Upadhyay Junction(Mugalsarai)
 Prayagraj Sangam-Lucknow Passenger
 Prayagraj Sangam-Bareilly Express
 Antyodaya Express- Chapra to Lokmanya Tilak Terminus]]
 Prayagraj Sangam-Ayodhya Cantt Passenger
 New Delhi- Malda Town Express
 Gareeb Rath Express- Varanasi to Anand Vihar
 Neelanchal Superfast Express- Puri to Anand Vihar
 Marudhar Express- Jodhpur to Varanasi
 Yog Nagri Rishikesh Haridwar Express- Prayagraj Sangam to Rishikesh
 Bikaner Superfast Express- Howrah to Bikaner
 Lal Kuan Superfast Express- Howrah to Lal Kuan junction
 Saket Express- Ayodhya Cantt to LTT Mumbai]]

References

Railway stations in Pratapgarh district
Lucknow NR railway division
Transport in Pratapgarh, Uttar Pradesh